is a Shingon Buddhist temple in Takarazuka, Hyōgo, Japan. It is one of the typical type of mixture of Shinto and Buddhism temples in Japan, and temple's name has two Chinese letters of two religions in Japan together, 'Jin'(神) of Shinto and 'Ji'(寺) of Buddhism. This type of mixture of two religions, called 'Shinbutsu shugo'(神仏習合) was very common among Japanese temples or shrines until the Edo period, but the two religions were formally and forcedly separated by Meiji Government in the last half of the 19th century. In this sense, this temple is a good example that still preserves Japanese religious traditions before modernization.

History
Kiyoshikōjin Seichō-ji is established in 896 by  according to the order of Emperor Uda. This temple met fire twice in the history. In the 12th century, it was destroyed by the fire in the war between Genji(源氏) clan and Heike clan(平家), however, rebuilt by General Yoritomo Minamoto in 1193. In the 16th century, this temple was again burned in the fire of war between a daimyō, Murashige Araki of Itami Castle, and famous Nobunaga Oda, in the process of re-unification of Japan by Nobunaga.

Object of Worship
Kōjin (kami of fire and hearth
Dainichi-Nyorai (Mahāvairocana, 大日如来)

Cultural Property
This temple has an Important Cultural Property selected by the Japanese government.

Dainichi-Nyorai (Mahāvairocana, 大日如来)

Access
Kiyoshikōjin Station of Hankyu Takarazuka Line

See also

 For an explanation of terms concerning Japanese Buddhism, Japanese Buddhist art, and Japanese Buddhist temple architecture, see the Glossary of Japanese Buddhism.

Buddhist temples in Hyōgo Prefecture
Religious organizations established in the 9th century
9th-century Buddhist temples
Religious buildings and structures completed in 896